Spirocyclistus maximus is a species of millipede belonging to the family Spirostreptidae.

References

Spirostreptida